The community of Teslin (Tlingit: Desleen) includes the Village of Teslin in Yukon, Canada. Teslin is situated at historical Mile 804 on the Alaska Highway along Teslin Lake. The Hudson's Bay Company established a small trading post at Teslin in 1903 (i.e. Teslin Post).

Teslin is home to the Teslin Inland Tlingit First Nations. The name Teslin came from a Tlingit word "Teslintoo." Teslin has one of the largest Native populations in Yukon. Much of the community's livelihood revolves around traditional hunting, trapping and fishing.

Demographics 
Village of Teslin

Teslin Post 13

Arts and culture 
Teslin is made up of two moieties; Wolf and Crow. Under the moiety of Wolf there are two clans; Eagle (Dakhl'awedi') and Wolf (Yanyedi). The Crow moiety have three clans; Raven's Children (Kukhhittan or Crow), Frog (Ishkitan) and Split tail Beaver (Deshitan). Under their matrilineal kinship system, children are considered born into the mother's clan, and descent is traced through her line.

George Johnston (trapper) (1884–1972), trapper and photographer, founder of "Teslin Taxi." He captured the life of the inland Tlingit people of Teslin and Atlin in numerous photos taken between 1910 and 1940. Johnston also brought the first car to Teslin; it was a 1928 Chevrolet. He built a  road for his "Teslin taxi" since the Alaska Highway had not been built yet. In winter, he put chains on the car, painted it white, and drove it on frozen Teslin Lake. The '28 Chevy has been restored and is now on permanent display at the George Johnston Museum in Teslin.

Government
In 1995 the Teslin Inland Tlingit negotiated and signed a land claims agreement with the federal government, under which they re-established their own government and became self-sustaining. The Teslin Inland Tlingit now enact their own legal and political framework for government-to-government relations with Canada and the Yukon.

The Teslin Tlingit Council have the right to make their own laws and regulations. There are many different departments within Teslin Tlingit Council (TTC), for example: Finance, Lands and Resources, Health and Social.

The people have developed the Teslin Tlingit Council Clan System Government, which combines traditional Tlingit Clan culture with contemporary organizational and management principles. The five clans (Eagle, Crow, Frog, Wolf, and Beaver) each appoint five members to the 25-member General Council, and have recognized Elders (persons 58 years and older) on the Elders Council.

Geography

Climate 
Teslin has a dry-summer subarctic climate (Köppen climate classification: Dfc). Summer days are mild along with cool nights. Winters are cold and snowy, with annual snowfall averaging .

Gallery

Notable people
 Marian Horne (born 1943), politician (Yukon Party), elected in 2006 as MLA, Minister of Justice and Minister responsible for Women's Directorate in the Yukon Legislative Assembly 
 Sam Johnston (Yukon politician), Tlingit elder and former politician, former chancellor of Yukon College, and member of the Order of Yukon

See also
 List of municipalities in Yukon
 Teslin Plateau

References

External links

Hudson's Bay Company trading posts
Villages in Yukon